Verviers-Central is a railway station in the town of Verviers, Liège, Belgium. The station opened on 1 February 1930 and is located on line 37. The train services are operated by National Railway Company of Belgium (NMBS).

Train services
The station is served by the following services:

Intercity services (IC-01) Ostend - Bruges - Gent - Brussels - Leuven - Liège - Welkenraedt - Eupen
Intercity services (IC-12) Kortrijk - Gent - Brussels - Leuven - Liège - Welkenraedt (weekdays)
Local services (L-09) Spa - Pepinster - Verviers - Welkenraedt - Aachen
Local services (L-17) Herstal - Liège - Pepinster - Verviers

See also
 List of railway stations in Belgium

References

External links
 
 Verviers-Central railway station at Belgian Railways website

Railway stations in Belgium
Railway stations opened in 1930
Railway stations in Liège Province
Verviers